Atrapsalta is a genus of cicadas belonging to the family Cicadidae.

The species of this genus are found in Australia.

Species
Species:

Atrapsalta collina 
Atrapsalta corticina 
Atrapsalta dolens 
Atrapsalta emmotti 
Atrapsalta encaustica 
Atrapsalta furcilla 
Atrapsalta fuscata 
Atrapsalta siccana 
Atrapsalta vinea

References

Cicadidae
Hemiptera genera